Mark Francis Russell (born 22 May 1960) is a British businessman, serving since 2007 as the Chief Executive of the British government's Shareholder Executive. He joined ShEx in 2004 as the director of Corporate Finance Practice, becoming its deputy chief executive in 2007, where he stayed until 2013 when he became the head of the agency when Stephen Lovegrove moved to be the permanent secretary of the Department of Energy and Climate Change. As of September 2015, Russell was paid a salary of between £160,000 and £164,999, making him one of the 328 most highly paid people in the British public sector at that time.

References

External links 
 Interview with Mark Russell shortly after he became the head of ShEx

Living people
1960 births
British businesspeople
British civil servants